Giant is a 2010 South Korean television series starring Lee Beom-soo, Park Jin-hee, Joo Sang-wook, Hwang Jung-eum, Park Sang-min, and Jeong Bo-seok. It aired on SBS from 10 May to 7 December 2010 on Mondays and Tuesdays at 21:55 for 60 episodes. Giant is a sprawling period drama about three siblings' quest for revenge during the economic boom of 1970-80s Korea. Tragically separated during childhood, the three reunite as adults and set out to avenge their parents' deaths, their fates playing out against a larger tide of power, money, politics, and the growth of a city.

Plot
The plot revolves around the lives of the three Lee children: Kang-mo, Sung-mo, and Mi-joo. Their father was killed by Hwang Tae-seob and Jo Pil-yeon, and their mother died in an accident. As a result, the children were separated. Kang-mo and Sung-mo were raised by their father's killers: Kang-mo helped Hwang Tae-seob avoid bankruptcy by advocating the use of a different landfill material, and was later adopted by Tae-seob, and Sung-mo was raised by Jo Pil-yeon, who is a KCIA official. After growing up and knowing the truth, the brothers set off on a quest for revenge. Mi-joo and Jo Pil-yeon's son, Min-woo, fall in love but cannot be allowed together because their families are enemies. Mi-joo becomes pregnant and goes into hiding while Min-woo desperately searches for her. The whole series revolves around the brothers trying to bring down Jo Pil-yeon, who is also cunning and slippery in his political tactics. Later, Sung-mo is shot in the head by an agent of Jo Pil-yeon. Miraculously, he survived, and had to hide from the KCIA. Jo Pil-yeon tries to work in the government by making false papers. Kang-mo finds out that Sung-mo has knowledge of the contents of the real papers, and finds him. They release the papers, and Jo Pil-yeon fails his objective. He runs away, but is later found and arrested. Sung-mo undergoes surgery to take the bullet out of his head, but tragically dies. Many years later, a now-insane Jo Pil-yeon breaks out of prison to try to murder Kang-mo, but fails, and he commits suicide afterwards. The last scene shows Kang-mo receiving word from his wife Hwang Jung-yeon (Hwang Tae-seob's daughter) that his long-lost brother (a fourth sibling who was adopted by an American couple many years ago) has come to visit him....

Cast

Main characters
 Lee Beom-soo as Lee Kang-Mo
 Yeo Jin-goo as young Kang-mo 
 Park Jin-hee as Hwang Jung-yeon 
 Nam Ji-hyun as young Jung-yeon 
 Joo Sang-wook as Jo Min-woo
 Noh Young-hak as young Min-woo 
 Hwang Jung-eum as Lee Mi-joo
 Park Ha-young as young Mi-joo 
 Park Sang-min as Lee Sung-Mo
 Kim Soo-hyun as young Sung-mo
 Jeong Bo-seok as Jo Pil-yeon
 Lee Deok-hwa as Hwang Tae-seob
 Kim Seo-hyung as Yoo Kyung-ok
 Lee Moon-sik as Park So-tae
 Seo Ji-won as young So-tae

Supporting characters

 Yoon Yoo-sun as Jung Young-sun, Kang-mo's mother
 Yoon Hyung-kwan as Yeom Jae-soo
 Shin Seung-hwan as Yeom Shi-deok
 Jung Seung-won as young Shi-deok
 Choi Ha-na as Yeom Kyung-ja
 Han Kyung-sun as Lee Bok-ja
 Im Jong-yoon as Yoon Ki-hoon
 Moon Hee-kyung as Oh Nam-sook
 Kim Jung-hyun as Hwang Jung-shik
 Jang Soon-gook as Joo Young-gook
 Lee Seung-hyung as Moon Sung-joong
 Park No-shik as Park Choong-kwon
 Song Kyung-chul as Nam Young-chul
 Bang Kil-seung as drill instructor
 Hong Yeo-jin as Yang Myung-ja
 Yoon Yong-hyun as Go Jae-choon
 Hwang Taek-ha as Yoo Chan-sung
 Lee Hyo-jung as Han Myung-seok
 Kim Hak-chul as Oh Byung-tak
 Lee Ki-young as Min Hong-ki
 Im Hyuk as Baek Pa
 Jung Gyu-soo as Lee Dae-soo
 Son Byong-ho as Hong Ki-pyo
 Lee Eun-jung as Ji-na
 Jeon Jin-gi as detective lieutenant
 Kim Sung-oh as Cha Bu-chul
 Han Da-min as Cheon Soo-yeon
 Kim Eui-jin as Woo-joo
 Choi Gun-woo as Lee Joon-mo
 Lee Won-il as young Joon-mo
 Lee Soo-jin as Nurse Kim
 Yoo Ho-rin as Ji Yeon-soo
 Kim Young-sun as Yoon Ki-hoon's wife
 Moon Ji-in as female employee at Manbo Construction
 Choi Min as gang boss
 Min Joon-hyun
 Kim Ga-eun
 Ji-yoo
 Qri as Bunny Girls (cameo)
 Park So-yeon as Bunny Girls (cameo)
 Shin Shin-ae as Inn's hostess (cameo)

Ratings

Awards and nominations

References

External links
  
 
 

Seoul Broadcasting System television dramas
2010 South Korean television series debuts
2010 South Korean television series endings
Korean-language television shows
Television shows written by Jang Young-chul
South Korean action television series
South Korean melodrama television series
Television series by JS Pictures